Russia in Flames: War, Revolution, Civil War, 1914–1921 is a narrative history of the Russian Revolution and Civil War, written by Laura Engelstein and published in 2017 by Oxford University Press. The release was timed with the 100th anniversary of the Russian Revolution.

Synopsis
Russia in Flames explores the period of 19141921 and how the procession of war, collapse, and disintegration (as the subtitle indicates) brought Russia communists to power and eventual resulted in the Bolsheviks dominating and then destroying other political, social, and military power centers. 

Engelstein's work focuses on the "problem of power" and how the Bolsheviks navigated social, Marxist, and internal party politics to seize power, center it on themselves, and finally create a one party state. After this Engelstein explores how the Bolsheviks recreated government to exert control over both Russia and the Russian Empire and eventually win the Civil War. Along with the problem of power, Engelstein explores the role violence and propaganda filled in the seizure and consolidation of power, and how it was used to destroy existing institutions and power centers making way for the Bolshevik institutions, ideas, and authority which replaced them.

Engelstein argues that Lenin and the Bolsheviks "did not so much seize power but rather created it." She believe the collapse of the state and empire created a power vacuum that different revolutionary groups raced to fill. The main tools they employed to achieve total power were the unrestricted use of violence to destroy their political opponents, and the Red Army, created and led by Leon Trotsky, which despite its many limitations ultimately suppressed the white and green forces, and defeated the foreign interventions. 

Engelstein narrates the events that took place between the February Revolution and the October Bolshevik coup the culminated the months of tension and deteriorating relationships within the socialist coalition government. Her analysis of how the coalition government disintegrated into Civil War disproves the misconception that the death and destruction brought on by the Civil War altered the "original character of the Bolshevik party."

Structure
The book is divided into roughly equal halves; the first half primarily dealing with the period of Russian involvement in World War I and the revolution which followed, the second half focusing on the period of the Russian Civil War. The book is structured into six parts, with the first and final parts forming short bookends opening and closing the narrative:
 Part 1: The Last Years of the Old Empire, 19041914.
 Part 2: The Great War: Imperial Self-Destruction, 19141917.
 Part 3: The Contest For Control, 1917.
 Part 4: Sovereign Claims, 19181921.
 Part 5: The War Within, 19181921.
 Part 6: Victory and Retreat, 1921.
The book contains a ten page bibliography essay as an appendix.

Reception
In Europe Asia Studies, Daniel Orlovsky writes, "Laura Engelstein’s magnificent volume provides a fresh and comprehensive, though weighted toward the political, vision of the Russian Revolution. Positives abound in this long book, most important is her powerful and metaphorical language. She is able to turn a phrase that captures the meaning of salient historical trends."

Academic journal reviews

Release information
 Hardcover: 2017 (First Edition), Oxford University Press, 856pp. .
 Paperback: 2019 (First Edition), Oxford University Press, 856pp. .
 Audiobook: 2019, Narrated by Anne Flosnik, published by Tantor Audio.

Similar or related works
 A People's Tragedy by Orlando Figes (1997).
 Russia in Revolution: An Empire in Crisis, 1890 to 1928 by Stephen Smith (historian) (2017).
 The Russian Revolution: A New History by Sean McMeekin (2017).

About the author
 
 
Laura Engelstein is an American historian and author who specializes in Russian and European history. She served as Henry S. McNeil Professor Emerita of Russian History at Yale University and taught at Cornell University and Princeton University.

See also
 Russian Revolution of 1905
 Eastern Front of the Russian Civil War
 Southern Front of the Russian Civil War
 North Russia Intervention
 Russia: Revolution and Civil War, 1917—1921 (book)
 Russia in Flames: War, Revolution, Civil War, 1914–1921 (book)
 Russia in Revolution: An Empire in Crisis, 1890 to 1928 (book)
 The Russian Revolution: A New History (book)

References

Notes

Citations

External links
 Book page; Oxford University Press.
 Laura Engelstein; Faculty page, Yale University

2017 non-fiction books
Books about communism
Books about the Russian Revolution
Oxford University Press books